Potion Permit is a 2022 video game developed by MassHive Media and published by PQube.

Gameplay 
Gameplay consists primarily of action role-playing elements, with minigames used to represent certain complex actions such as creating a potion. Additional gameplay elements come from the foraging system, as well as socialization with non-player characters (NPCs).

Development 
Potion Permit was developed in Bandung, Indonesia by the studio MassHive Media, having been inspired by Stardew Valley, Moonlighter, and other games. The game was announced in September 2020.

The game was released for Microsoft Windows, Nintendo Switch, PlayStation 4, PlayStation 5, Xbox One, and Xbox Series X/S on September 22, 2022, and on Amazon Luna on September 23, 2022.

Reception 

Potion Permit received "mixed or average" reviews, according to review aggregator Metacritic.

GameSpot praised the aesthetics and narrative of the game, though it also noted issues with the depiction of some character traits. Nintendo Life similarly praised the aesthetics of the game in their review, additionally making a positive note of the mini-games, while critiquing the low difficulty of the game.

GameSpot, Destructoid and Push Square both noted the presence of a large number of bugs as a detracting point. TouchArcade noted that the performance issues on Switch hardware could lead to issues in timing critical minigames.

References 

2022 video games
Windows games
Xbox One games
Xbox Series X and Series S games
PlayStation 4 games
PlayStation 5 games
Nintendo Switch games
Video games developed in Indonesia
Social simulation video games
Video games featuring protagonists of selectable gender
Retro-style video games
Single-player video games
PQube games